Harold Ordway  Rugg (1886–1960) was an educational reformer in the early to mid 1900s, associated with the Progressive education movement.  Originally trained in civil engineering at Dartmouth College (BS 1908 & CE 1909), Rugg went on to study psychology, sociology and education at the University of Illinois where he completed a dissertation titled "The Experimental Determination of Mental Discipline in School Studies."

After earning his Ph.D. he went on to teach at the University of Chicago and later became a professor at Teacher's College at Columbia University. He studied the creativity which he believed was vital to the learning process. He created the first textbook series and his social studies books were extremely popular in US schools.  By the early forties his books fell out of favor due to campaigns run by organizations like the Advertising Federation of America and the American Legion, due to Rugg's junior-high textbooks including concepts considered "pro-socialist" by conservative opponents.

Biography
Rugg was born on January 17, 1886, in Fitchburg, Massachusetts.  Rugg went to school at Dartmouth College, where he received his bachelor of science in civil engineering in 1908 and his graduate degree in civil engineering in 1909.  Rugg worked as a civil engineer before becoming a professor at Millikin University in Decatur, Illinois, where he became interested in how students learn.

Rugg began teaching at the University of Illinois in 1911 and in 1915, Rugg submitted his dissertation, "The Experimental Determination of Mental Discipline in School Studies." in order to attain his Ph.D. in education.  During World War I, Rugg served as a member of the Army's Commission on Classification of Personnel under Charles H Judd.  The commission is credited with testing adults for aptitudes and intelligence.  Rugg used his wartime experience in educational statistics to study children's education.  He taught at the University of Chicago from 1915 until January 1920, where he pioneered the application of quantitative methods to educational problems.  In 1917, he published Statistical Methods Applied to Education and in 1926 published The Child-Centered School, which was an early influence on the progressive education movement. Rugg took a job at the Teachers College of Columbia University, where he stayed until he retired in 1951.  While he was teaching at Columbia, Rugg became a spokesperson for the reconstructionist perspective, which viewed formal education as an agent of social change.  His views were widely distributed, and Rugg has been credited with consolidating social sciences and creating a curriculum for the consolidated subject.

He created the first series of an educational book, Man and His Changing Society, which was a junior high school social studies textbook that ran 14 volumes from 1929 until the early 1940s.  Man and His Changing Society fell under scrutiny of the Advertising Federation of America and the American Legion for "pro-socialist ideas" because he illustrated the American society as having strengths and weaknesses. The Advertising Federation of America, or AFA, and the American Legion felt that these topics undermined the stability of American society.  Many school districts pulled the textbook series subsequently starting censorship of his textbook.  Rugg published Culture and Education in America in 1931, The Great Technology in 1933, and American Life and the School Curriculum in 1936.  Each of these books discussed problems in American society and how education could solve them.

In addition to emphasizing the social engineering philosophies of the reconstructionists, Rugg argued that individual integrity was vital to a good society and could be fostered by creative self-expression.  Therefore, he championed the expansion of creative activities within school curriculum and would continue to research creativity after his retirement from Columbia in 1951.  Rugg died at his home on May 17, 1960, in Woodstock, New York.  Imagination was published posthumously in 1963 and was the crescendo of his research into the creative process.

In 1922 he was elected as a fellow of the American Statistical Association.

Education

 1908 - BS from Dartmouth
 1909 - MS from Dartmouth
 1915 - Ph.D. in education from University of Illinois

Professional employment

 1909-1910 - Missouri Pacific Railroad – Civil Engineer
 1910-1911 - James Millikin University – Professor
 1914-1915 - U.S. Army – Researcher
 1915-1920 - University of Chicago – Professor
 1920-1951 - Columbia University - Professor

Bibliography

 1915 - The Experimental Determination of Mental Discipline in School Studies
 1917 – Statistical Methods Applied to Education
 1926 – The Child-Centered School
 1929 – Man and His Changing Society
 1930 - A History of American Civilization Economic and Social
 1931 – Culture and Education in America
 1933 – The Great Technology
 1933 - Study Guide to National Recovery: An Introduction to Economic Problems, John Day – with Marvin Krueger
 1936 – American Life and the School Curriculum
 1947 – Foundations for American Education
 1963 – Imagination

References

1886 births
1960 deaths
Dartmouth College alumni
20th-century American educators
American textbook writers
American male non-fiction writers
Education reform
University of Illinois alumni
University of Chicago faculty
Columbia University faculty
Fellows of the American Statistical Association
20th-century American male writers